Milosh Tosheski (born 24 February 1998) is a Macedonian footballer who plays for FK Rabotnički as a central midfielder.

Club career
Born in Belgrade, FR Yugoslavia, now Serbia, Tosheski started his senior football career at local club FK Brodarac. Next, he joined Serbian SuperLiga club FK Zemun in summer 2018.

References

1998 births
Living people
Footballers from Belgrade
Association football midfielders
Macedonian footballers
North Macedonia youth international footballers
North Macedonia under-21 international footballers
FK Brodarac players
FK Zemun players
FK Rabotnički players
Serbian SuperLiga players
Macedonian First Football League players